Samuel Issacharoff (born 1954) is an American law professor, whose scholarly work focuses on constitutional law, voting rights and civil procedure.

Career
Issacharoff graduated from Binghamton University in 1975 and Yale Law School in 1983. He was a member of the Spartacist League (US) as a student. Issacharoff was born in Argentina in Buenos Aires.
He is currently the Bonnie and Richard Reiss Professor of Constitutional Law at New York University School of Law. He served as a visiting professor at Harvard Law School for the Fall 2008 semester. Prior to joining NYU Law's faculty, he taught at Columbia Law School and The University of Texas School of Law.

In 2017, Issacharof was interviewed by Suraj Patel for Talks on Law on the topic of gerrymandering.

Personal life
His wife, Cynthia Estlund, is a labor and employment-law professor, also at New York University School of Law.

Publications
The Supreme Court, 2012 Term — Comment: Beyond the Discrimination Model on Voting, 127 Harv. L. Rev. 95 (2013).
The Supreme Court, 2009 Term — Comment: On Political Corruption, 124 Harv. L. Rev. 118 (2010).
Fragile Democracies, 120 Harv. L. Rev. 1405 (2007).
Party Funding and Campaign Financing in International Perspective with Keith Ewing (eds.) (2006) 
Civil Procedure (2005)   (pbk. : alk. paper).
The Law of Democracy: Legal Structure of the Political Process with Pamela S. Karlan, Richard H. Pildes. (1998)   (alk. paper).
The State of Voting Rights Law  (1993).
When Elections Go Bad: The Law of Democracy and the Presidential Election of 2000 with Pamela S. Karlan, Richard H. Pildes. Rev. ed. (2001)   (alk. paper)

References

External links
NYU faculty profile
Papers by Samuel Issacharoff in SSRN
New York Observer, "NYU's Big Raid"

1954 births
Living people
American legal scholars
New York University faculty
Yale Law School alumni
Binghamton University alumni
Columbia University faculty
University of Texas at Austin faculty
Harvard Law School faculty
New York University School of Law faculty